Cesis may refer to:

Cēsis, a town in Latvia
Cēsis municipality, Latvia
Cēsis Castle,  Latvia
Cēsis District,  Latvia
SK Cēsis,  a women's basketball club, Latvia
Sulpitia Cesis, Italian renaissance composer
CESIS, (Executive Committee for Intelligence and Security Services) an Italian government committee